Colomba Fofana (born 11 April 1977 in Courbevoie) is a French triple jumper. His personal best jump is 17.34 metres, achieved in May 2008 in Forbach. He competed at the 2000 Summer Olympics, the 2008 Summer Olympics, and the 2006 World Indoor Championships, without reaching the final.

Achievements

References

External links 
 
 
 
 
 
 

1977 births
Living people
French male triple jumpers
Athletes (track and field) at the 2000 Summer Olympics
Athletes (track and field) at the 2008 Summer Olympics
Olympic athletes of France
People from Courbevoie